Ace A's and Killer B's is a compilation album (comprising several singles as well as B-sides) by the English band Dodgy, released in 1998.

Track listing
All songs written by Dodgy unless noted.
 "Every Single Day" – 4:01 (non-album single) (Nigel Clark)
 "Staying Out for the Summer (Summer 95)" – 3:07 (from Homegrown)
 "Water Under the Bridge" – 3:44 (from The Dodgy Album)
 "Good Enough" – 4:01 (from Free Peace Sweet)
 "Melodies Haunt You" – 3:41 (from Homegrown)
 "Big Brown Moon" – 3:25 (b-side of Lovebirds)
 "Found You" – 4:55 (from Free Peace Sweet)
 "Self Doubt" – 3:51 (b-side of "In a Room")
 "In a Room" – 4:17 (from Free Peace Sweet)
 "Making the Most Of" – 4:05 (from Homegrown)
 "If You're Thinking of Me" – 5:27 (from Free Peace Sweet)
 "Lovebirds" – 3:56 (from The Dodgy Album)
 "(Get Off Your) High Horse" – 4:40 (b-side of Staying Out for the Summer)
 "So Let Me Go Far" – 4:07 (from Homegrown)
 "Grassman" – 6:19 (from Homegrown)
 "Ain't No Longer Asking" – 5:11 (from Free Peace Sweet)
 "The Elephant" – 5:26 (b-side of The Black and White Single)

References

Dodgy albums
1998 compilation albums
A&M Records albums